Cuore contro cuore (Heart to heart) is a 2004 Italian television series directed by Riccardo Mosca, produced by Taodue and broadcast on Canale 5 during the summer of 2010. The protagonists of the series are Ennio Fantastichini, Isabella Ferrari and Carlotta Natoli.

Cast
Ennio Fantastichini: Claudio Donati
Isabella Ferrari: Francesca De Luca
Carlotta Natoli: Alessandra Vinci
Rocco Papaleo: Rocco Amato
Victoria Cabello: Alice
Chiara de Bonis: Serena Maggi
Nicolò Diana: Luca Donati

See also
List of Italian television series

External links
 

Italian television series
Canale 5 original programming

Italian legal television series